Ploskovo is a rural locality (a village) in Mstyora Urban Settlement, Vyaznikovsky District, Vladimir Oblast, Russia. The population was 4 as of 2010. There are no streets with titles.

Geography 
Ploskovo is located 15 km northwest of Vyazniki (the district's administrative centre) by road. Stanki is the nearest rural locality.

References 

Rural localities in Vyaznikovsky District